Ed Schieffer (born November 28, 1949) was a Democratic member of the Missouri House of Representatives. He represented the 11th District, encompassing all or parts of Lincoln county. Schieffer was first elected to the Missouri House in November, 2006, and reelected in 2008, 2010 and 2012.

Personal history
Edward L. Schieffer was born in Troy, Missouri, the oldest son of Albert and Betty (Zalabak) Schieffer, and raised on the family farm nearby. Following his graduation from Troy Buchanan High School in 1967, Schieffer attended Northeast Missouri State College in Kirksville where he earned a Bachelor's degree in Education in 1971. He would later earn a Master's degree in Education from Southern Illinois University Edwardsville in 1977. Schieffer taught in Missouri schools for nearly three decades and is also a licensed insurance salesman, auctioneer, and real estate broker. He is a 4th degree Knights of Columbus member. Ed Schieffer and wife Maria live on their family farm near Troy, Missouri. They are the parents of two grown children.

Political history
Ed Schieffer's first attempt at public office came in 2002 when he ran for the Missouri State Senate 2nd District seat, losing to Republican Jon Dolan by nearly 11,000 votes. Schieffer was more successful in his next attempt, winning the Missouri 11th District State Representative race in 2006, defeating Republican Milton Schaper and Libertarian candidate Gregory James Arrigo. He won re-election in 2008, 2010 and 2012. In 2014, he tried for the Senate again, this time in the 10th District.

Legislative assignments
Rep. Schieffer will serve on the following committees during the 96th General Assembly:
 Agri-Business
 Agriculture Policy
 Appropriations - Transportation and Economic Development subcommittee
 Transportation

References

1949 births
Living people
People from Troy, Missouri
Democratic Party members of the Missouri House of Representatives
Schoolteachers from Missouri
Truman State University alumni
Southern Illinois University Edwardsville alumni